The Bahnwärter Thiel is a techno club, music venue and alternative cultural center in Munich, Germany. It is named after the novella "Bahnwärter Thiel" by German author Gerhart Hauptmann.

Description
The venue consists of repurposed intermodal containers, a temporary pavilion formerly used by the Lenbachhaus, as well as decommissioned subway cars. It hosts club nights and outdoor raves, lectures, exhibitions, improvisational theatre, concerts, and flea markets.

History

Origins and first sites 
Daniel Hahn founded Bahnwärter-Kulturstätten in 2015, and Bahnwärter Thiel opened in the same year. The concept featured a withdrawn MAN Schienenbus railbus, repurposed as a culture venue on the grounds of the former "Viehhof" (Slaughterhouse) in Munich. The railbus was first used as part of the alternative christmas market "Märchenbazar" in November 2015.

In May 2016, the railbus was moved to the grounds of the University of Television and Film Munich for summer 2016. In May 2017, the railbus once again was moved to the University of Television and Film, this time being rebranded as "Minna Thiel", named after the wife of the protagonist of the novel "Bahnwärter Thiel" by Gerhart Hauptmann.

Viehbahnhof location 
After a five-year lease-agreement was reached, the Bahnwärter Thiel venue permanently moved to the Viehhof in late 2017. The new location is on the former freight station of the Viehhof, the so-called Viehbahnhof, about 400 meters away from its previous location there. The concept for the new location includes ateliers, workspaces and workshops, as well as band practice rooms, part of which will be located in some of the repurposed containers. This location on the Viehhof area sparked a debate about gentrification and spaces for subculture in Munich, as parts of the local graffiti scene feared that they might lose the last space in Munich where spraying graffiti was allowed and legal. Hahn has stated that it was always intended to include graffiti on the project and also wants to integrate the scene in the decoration of the venue.
The construction was organized by Bahnwärter Thiel staff, parts of the graffiti scene, and the City of Munich. Artists feared that the wooden wall might be used to prevent sprayers from entering the premises.
In May 2018, there was an arson attack on the venue, resulting in a wooden shed burning down.

A withdrawn Munich U-Bahn car was moved to the Bahnwärter Thiel in early 2018. Two more U-Bahn cars followed in October 2018. It is planned to use one of the cars as a cafeteria, and the other as a workspace. In May 2019 an old decommissioned tram from 1967 that was found in Ulm was brought to the Bahnwärter Thiel. It is planned to use the tram as a youth center and for holding art workshops.

Future development 
The lease for the Viehhof area ends in 2022. The redevelopment of the Viehhof has already begun, with the construction of the new Münchner Volkstheater, which is scheduled to be completed in 2021. The city of Munich also plans to build apartments on parts of the area.

Reception
The New York Times cited Bahnwärter Thiel as an example of hip night life spots in Munich "that could give Berlin a run for its money". At the Munich Nightlife Awards, Bahnwärter Thiel was awarded the 3rd place in the category techno/house/electro in 2016, and the winner in the category ambience/scenery in 2017.

Associated Projects
Since 2018, the Bahnwärter Thiel crew also operates the party ship Alte Utting, a former passenger ship from the Ammersee lake that is now crossing an inner-city arterial road on a railway bridge in Munich, and received a lot of media attention as well.

Gallery

References

External links

 
  

Nightclubs in Munich
Electronic dance music venues
Buildings and structures in Munich
Music venues in Munich
Culture in Munich